Henry Raymond "Ray" Williams (13 November 1927 – 5 January 2014) was a Welsh international rugby union wing who played club rugby for Felinfoel and Llanelli. Williams was capped three times for Wales, playing between 1954 and 1958. He was also a mentor credited with a significant contribution to the success of Barry John.

References

Bibliography
 
 
 
 
 
 

1927 births
2014 deaths
Alumni of the University of Exeter
Felinfoel RFC players
Llanelli RFC players
Rugby union players from Felinfoel
Rugby union wings
Wales international rugby union players
Welsh rugby union players